Michael T. Scuse (born 1954) is an American government official serving as the Delaware Secretary of Agriculture. Scuse previously served as the acting United States Deputy Secretary of Agriculture and United States Secretary of Agriculture in the Obama administration.

Career
Prior to joining the United States Department of Agriculture, Scuse served as Secretary of the Delaware Department of Agriculture from May 2001 until September 2008, when he resigned to become Chief of Staff to Governor of Delaware Ruth Ann Minner.

From 2016 to 2017, Scouse served as the United States Deputy Secretary of Agriculture. Following the resignation of Tom Vilsack on January 13, 2017, he served as acting United States Secretary of Agriculture until Donald Trump took office as president. He also served as Under Secretary of Agriculture for Farm and Foreign Agricultural Services from 2012 to 2017.

He was re-appointed as Secretary of the Delaware Department of Agriculture by Governor-elect John Carney in January 2017.

Personal life
Scuse and his wife Patrice own a farm in Smyrna, Delaware.

References

External links
 

|-

|-

1954 births
Delaware Democrats
Living people
Obama administration cabinet members
People from Smyrna, Delaware
State cabinet secretaries of Delaware
United States Deputy Secretaries of Agriculture
United States Secretaries of Agriculture